The list of shipwrecks in 1991 includes ships sunk, foundered, grounded, or otherwise lost during 1991.

January

13 January

16 January

23 January

24 January

29 January

February

8 February

10 February

14 February

15 February

24 February

April

4 April

7 April

8 April

10 April

11 April

17 April

28 April

29 April

May

9 May

14 May

25 May

28 May

30 May

Unknown date

June

5 June

7 June

11 June

26 June

July

1 July

7 July

10 July

14 July

16 July

17 July

20 July

25 July

August

3 August

7 August

10 August

17 August

24 August

Unknown date

September

8 September

10 September

11 September

13 September

14 September

18 September

20 September

23 September

26 September

28 September

Unknown date

October

8 October

11 October

13 October

22 October

28 October

31 October

November

5 November

7 November

8 November

11 November

12 November

14 November

16 November

17 November

18 November

20 November

21 November

22 November

23 November

Unknown date

December

6 December

7 December

8 December

12 December

15 December

Unknown date

References

1991
 
Ship